(see terminology) is a generic term which refers to a two-piece set of attire in , which is typically composed of a ,{{NoteTag|Yi is typically literally translated as "clothing" nowadays; however, in ancient times, it was used to refer to "upper clothing; see page Ru for more details.}} a Chinese upper garment which typically overlaps and closes on the right side which could be called , , , and a pair of long trousers . The  was originally worn by both genders. Up until the mid-20th century, it was popular in China and outside of China where it was worn by overseas Chinese in countries, such as Singapore, Malaysia, Suriname, etc. It is still worn in present-day China and can be found in rural areas.

 Terminology 

The term ,  or  typically refers to the two-piece set of attire composed of an upper garment which is generally above and below the hips and knees and a pair of trousers, which are both made out of coarse cloth and was generally worn by people doing manual labour, such as farm work, and by martial artists.

 English definition 
In English language,  is commonly written as 'samfoo' in British English or 'samfu'. 

According to the Collins English Dictionary, the samfoo or samfu originated from the combination of the Chinese (Cantonese) words "sam" (dress) and "foo" (trousers). 

The Oxford Learner's Advanced Dictionaries and the Concise Oxford English Dictionary indicate that the term samfu originated in the 1950s from the Cantonese dialect shaam foò, 'shaam' which means ‘coat’ and 'foò' which means ‘trousers’. Among English dictionaries, there are variation in the definition of samfoo/ samfu. 

The Collins English Dictionary defines samfoo/samfu as being:

The Oxford Learner's Advanced Dictionaries defines samfu as being:

The 12th edition of the Concise Oxford English Dictionary defines samfu as being:  

 Design and Construction 
The  is a two-piece set of attire, which is composed of a jacket as an upper garment and a pair of trousers as a lower garment.

However, the two garments were sometimes made separately and did not belong to the same set of clothing.

 Upper garment 

Prior to the Qing dynasty, the shape of the collar and closure of the upper garment were typically , a collar which crosses or overlaps in the front and closed to the right side similar to the alphabet letter《y》in shape, as the ones worn in Ming dynasty and the previous dynasties, instead of the -style, the curved or slanted overlap closure which looks more similar to the alphabet letter《S》, which was commonly worn in the late Qing dynasty. The  could have a mandarin collar or a high standing collar.

The  could be long-sleeved, short-sleeved, or sleeveless depending on the time period. The sleeves could be wide or narrow, and the shape of the cuff could vary depending on styles and time period. 

The bodice of the  varied in length depending on the time period, but it could also be thigh-length.

 Lower garment 

The , as a general term, was a pair of long trousers which could be loose or narrow.

 Fitting 
The  is traditionally loose in terms of fitting. However, due to the influence of Western fashion, it became more tight fitting in the 1950s and 1960s.

 Colours 
The  was typically dyed in black, blue or grey. However, the colours of the  could vary depending on ethnic groups.

 History and development 

 Pre-history 
The form of the Neolithic  was different from the trousers worn nowadays as it came in pairs of legs like shoes. This form of  continued to be worn until the early Han dynasty.

 Shang dynasty 
The  can be traced back at least to the Shang dynasty. However, the lower garment called  remained in use to cover the -style  as the trousers in this period still lacked a rise. The , which was worn, was similar to a knee-length tunic.

 Zhou dynasty, Spring and Autumn period, and Warring States period 

 Adoption of  

The nomadic clothes adopted by King Wuling consisted of belts, short upper garment, and trousers.

The short garment was a coat was called , which appears to have been the outermost coat of all garment, resembling a robe with short body and loose sleeves. King Wuling was also known for wearing -style long trousers and upper garments with narrow sleeves. 

 Influence of  

The trousers with loose rise, which was adopted from the  policy was mainly worn by the military troops and servants while the general population typically continued to wear the -style  and the newly improved . These forms of -trousers were Chinese innovations.

 Qin dynasty 

In Qin dynasty, short clothing became more common and trousers were generally worn from what can be observed from the unearthed Qin dynasty tomb figures. 

The trousers were often wide at the top and narrower at the bottom and could be find with rise. 

Terracotta warriors, for example, wears a type of long robe which is worn on top of skirt and trousers. The Qin artisans valued contrasting colours; for example, the upper garments which were green in colour were often decorated with red or purple border; this upper garment would often be worn together with blue, or purple, or red trousers.

 Han dynasty 

Manual labourers tended to be wear even shorter upper garment and lower garment as due to their convenient use for work.

The  was worn with a loose robe (either  or ) in the Han dynasty by both military and civil officials. The  were trousers which were tied with strings under the knees.

The  continued to be worn for a long period of time, and was even worn in the Ming dynasty.

 Wei, Jin, Northern, and Southern dynasties 

Common women could either wear skirts or trousers under their jackets. Full trousers with slightly tempered cuffs or trousers which were tied just below the knees were worn under the jacket.

The  was a popular form of clothing attire and was worn by both genders; it was worn by both military and civil officials in the Northern and Southern dynasties. 

The  which appeared in the late Northern dynasty, was created by assimilating non-Han cultures in order to create a new design which reflected the Han Chinese culture. The , the style of -trousers were bounded at knees and dates back to the Han dynasty, allowed for greater ease of movement; they were also worn in the Western Jin to increase ease of movements when horseback riding or when on military duty.

 Sui to Tang dynasties 

 Song to Yuan dynasty 

 Song dynasty 
In Song dynasty, labourers who performed heavy tasks preferred to wear short jackets and trousers due to its convenience. In this period, the  worn by poor people were short length clothing and were made out of coarse fabric. 

 Yuan dynasty 

In Yuan dynasty, some scholars and commoners wore the terlig, a Mongol-style , which was braided at the waists and had pleats and narrow-fitting sleeves.

 Ming dynasty 
In Ming dynasty, the trousers with open-rise and close-rise were worn by men and women. Women in Ming continued to wear trousers under their skirts.

 Appearance of standing collars   

In the late Ming dynasty, jackets with high collars started to appear. The standup collar were closed with interlocking buttons made of gold and silver, called . The appearance of interlocking buckle promoted the emergence and the popularity of the standup collar and the Chinese jacket with buttons at the front, and laid the foundation of the use of Chinese knot buckles. In women garments of the Ming dynasty, the standup collar with gold and silver interlocking buckles became one of the most distinctive and popular form of clothing structure; it became commonly used in women's clothing reflecting the conservative concept of Ming women's chastity by keeping their bodies covered and due to  the climate changes during the Ming dynasty (i.e. the average temperature was low in China).

 Qing dynasty - 19th Century 
The high collar jacket continued to be worn in Qing dynasty, but it was not a common feature until the 20th century. In the late Qing, the high collar become more popular and was integrated to the jacket and robe of the Chinese and the Manchu becoming a regular garment feature instead of an occasional feature. For the Han Chinese women, the stand-up collar became a defining feature of their long jacket; this long jacket with high collar could be worn over their trousers but also over their skirts (i.e. aoqun). The high collar remained a defining feature of their jacket even in the first few years of the republic.

In Qing dynasty, Han Chinese women who wore  without wearing a skirt on top of their trousers were typically people born from the lower social class. Otherwise, they would wear trousers under their skirts which is in accordance with the traditions since the Han dynasty. In Mesny's Chinese Miscellany written in 1897 by William Mesny, it was however observed that skirts were worn by Chinese women over their trousers in some regions of China, but that in most areas, skirts were only used when women would go out for paying visits. He also observed that the wearing of trousers was a national custom for Chinese women and that trousers were worn in their homes when they would do house chores; he observed that women were dressed almost like men when working at home, except that their trousers had trims at the bottom of different coloured materials.

In the 19th century, the shan was long in length and the trousers ku was wide. In the late 19th century, men stopped wearing the shan which closes to the right and started wearing a jacket with a central-opening which looks similar to the Tangzhuang.

 20th Century 
In the 20th century, the 19th century long shan gradually became shorter and become more fitted. The neckband of the shan was also narrow. Sleeveless and short-sleeved shanku also existed in the 20th century.

In the 1950s, women of the lower status and those worked on farms would sometimes wear shanku which was decorated with floral patterns and checks. People living in urban areas started to wear western clothing while people in rural areas continued to wear shanku. In Hong Kong, shanku continued to be worn when people were away from their workplace.During the Great Leap Forward, the Mao suit became popular. but it was not expected for children to wear the Mao suit. While in cities, children started to wear Western style clothing, the children in the rural areas continued to wear the traditional shanku which were made of cotton checked fabrics, stripe fabrics, or other patterned fabrics.

 Ethnic clothing 

 Han Chinese 
Both Han Chinese women and men of the labouring classes wore shanku. The trousers, which could be found either narrow or wide, were a form of standard clothing for the Han Chinese.

 Hakka 
The Hakka people wears shanku as their traditional clothing; both Hakka men and women wear it. The preferred colours of the Hakka shanku is typically blue and black.

 Hoklo 

The Hoklo people wears shanku which is composed of fitted-style of shan which has a deeply curved hem and black-coloured trousers ku. Their shan was characterized by the bands decoration at the sleeves edges and at the garment opening as well as the collar of the shan which was very narrow and also consisted of piping rows. They typically wore bright colours such as light blue as every day wear while colours such as purple, deep blue, deep turquoise were reserved for special occasions.
 Tanka 
The Tanka people also wear shanku which is distinctive in style wherein the shan and the ku'' matched in colour; they prefer wearing colours which are lighter and brighter, such as pale green, pale blue, turquoise, yellow and pink. These lighter colours tended to be preferred by younger women or by newly married women; they were also worn on special occasions. On the other hand, darker colours were favoured by older women.

Influences and derivatives

Vietnam 
In the 15th century (from 1407 to 1478), the Vietnamese women adopted Chinese trousers under the occupation of the Ming dynasty. During the 17th and 18th century, Vietnam was divided in two regions with the Nguyen lords ruling the South. The Nguyen lords ordered that southern men and women had to wear Chinese-stye trousers and long front-buttoning tunics to differentiate themselves from the people living in the North. This form of outfit developed with time over the next century becoming the precursor of the áo dài, the outfit generally consisted of trousers, loose-fitting shirt with a stand-up collar and a diagonal right side closure which run from the neck to the armpit; these features were inspired by the Chinese and the Manchu clothing. 

In the pre-20th century, Vietnamese people of both sexes continue to maintain old Ming-style of Chinese clothing consisting of a long and loose knee-length tunics and ankle-length, loose trousers. In the 1920s, the form ensemble outfit was refitted to become the Vietnamese dress female national dress, the ladies' áo dài.

Related content 

Áo dài - a Vietnamese equivalent
Ru - a type of Chinese upper garment
Hufu - non-Han Chinese clothing
Tangzhuang

See also 

 Hanfu
 Ruqun
 Hakka people

Notes

References 

Chinese traditional clothing